This is a compilation of every international soccer game played by the United States men's national soccer team from 2010 through 2019. It includes the team's record for that year, each game played during the year, and the date each game was played. It also lists the U.S. goal scorers.

Home team is listed first. U.S. is listed first at home or neutral site.

Records are in win–loss–tie format. Games decided in penalty kicks are counted as ties, as per the FIFA standard.

2010

2011

2012

2013

2014

2015

2016

2017

2018

2019

See also
United States at the FIFA World Cup
United States at the CONCACAF Gold Cup
United States at the Copa América

External links
 USA Men's National Team: All-time Results, 1990-present
 U.S. Soccer Federation 2016 Men's National Team Media Guide

2010
2010 in American soccer
2011 in American soccer
2012 in American soccer
2013 in American soccer
2014 in American soccer
2015 in American soccer
2016 in American soccer
2017 in American soccer
2018 in American soccer
2019 in American soccer